Jan Grzesik (born 21 October 1994) is a Polish professional footballer who plays as a right-back for Warta Poznań.

Club career
On 25 August 2020, he signed with Warta Poznań.

References

1994 births
People from Olesno
Sportspeople from Opole Voivodeship
Living people
Polish footballers
Association football defenders
Zagłębie Sosnowiec players
MKP Pogoń Siedlce players
Siarka Tarnobrzeg players
ŁKS Łódź players
Warta Poznań players
Ekstraklasa players
I liga players
II liga players